
Year 291 BC was a year of the pre-Julian Roman calendar. At the time it was known as the Year of the Consulship of Megellus and Brutus (or, less frequently, year 463 Ab urbe condita). The denomination 291 BC for this year has been used since the early medieval period, when the Anno Domini calendar era became the prevalent method in Europe for naming years.

Events 
 By place 
 Greece 
 Demetrius Poliorcetes joins his son, Antigonus, in the siege of Thebes. As the Thebans defend their city stubbornly, Demetrius forces his men to attack the city at great cost. Demetrius finally takes the city after using siege engines to demolish its walls.

 Roman Republic 
 Third Samnite War:
 The proconsul Q. Fabius Maximus Gurges and legate Q. Fabius Maximus Rullianus besiege the Samnite town of Cominium Ocritum, but the consul Lucius Postumius Megellus orders Fabius Gurges to relinquish his command and evacuate Samnium, despite the fact that the Senate had appointed Fabius proconsul to campaign against the Samnites.
 Fabius Gurges celebrates a triumph, at which the Samnite general Gavius Pontius is beheaded.
 Postumius captures Cominium Ocritum, the major city of Venusia and other towns, killing 10,000 and capturing 6200. At the proposal of Postumius, the Senate sends 20,000 colonists to occupy Venusia, the largest Roman colony to date. However, angered by the various crimes of Postumius, the Senate does not choose him as one of the leaders of the colony and denies him a triumph.
 Postumius celebrates a triumph on his own authority and dismisses his army before the consuls for the following year can take over.

 China 
 Generals Sima Cuo and Bai Qi of the State of Qin attack the State of Wei and capture the city of Yuan. Next, Sima Cuo captures the cities of Zhi and Deng.
 Bai Qi then captures the city of Wan in the state of Chu.

Births 
 Lü Buwei, Chinese politician and chancellor of the Qin State (d. 235 BC)

Deaths 
 Menander, Athenian dramatist, considered to be a master of Greek New Comedy (b. c. 342 BC)
 Dinarchus, Athenian speech writer whose work is generally thought to reflect the gradual decline of Attic oratory (b. c. 361 BC)
 Gavius Pontius, Samnite general
 Emperor Kōan of Japan, according to legend.

References